Meladema lanio is a species of beetle in family Dytiscidae. It is endemic to Portugal.

References

Arthropods of Madeira
Dytiscidae
Beetles described in 1938
Taxonomy articles created by Polbot